Doquz Khatun (also spelled Dokuz Khatun) (d. 1265) was a 13th-century princess of the Keraites who was married to Hulagu Khan, founder of the Ilkhanate.

Life 
Doquz Khatun was a granddaughter of the Keraite khan Toghrul, through his son Uyku or Abaqu. She was given to Tolui at first following the demise of her grandfather. After his death in 1232, she was wed to Hulagu, his step-son in levirate marriage. She was known to accompany Hulagu on campaigns. At the Siege of Baghdad (1258), the Mongols massacred tens of thousands of inhabitants, but through the influence of Doquz, the Christians were spared.

Doquz Khatun was a Christian in the Church of the East, and is often mentioned as a great benefactor of the Christian faith. When Mongol envoys were sent to Europe, they also tried to use Doquz's Christianity to their advantage, by claiming that Mongol princesses such as Doquz and her aunt Sorghaghtani Beki were daughters of the legendary Prester John. 

Doquz Khatun was a supporter of her step-son Abaqa and retained her influential position even after the death of her husband. She secured succession of Denha I to patriarchal throne of Church of the East in her capacity. She died on 16 June 1265, 4 months after her husband. Stepanos Orbelian later claimed that she was poisoned by Shams al-Din Juvayni.

See also
Christianity among the Mongols

References

Works cited

 

13th-century Mongolian women
Nestorians
Women of the Mongol Empire
Mongol Empire Christians
1265 deaths
Year of birth unknown
Women in 13th-century warfare
Women in war in the Middle East
Women in war in East Asia
Kerait people